Cura Mori District is one of ten districts of the province Piura in Peru. The district was created by the law Ley N° 15434 of February 19, 1965 during the government of Peruvian President Fernando Belaúnde.

References

External links
INEI Perú

1965 establishments in Peru
States and territories established in 1965